Rewati Raman Bhandari is a member of 2nd Nepalese Constituent Assembly. He won Sunsari–2 seat in 2013 Nepalese Constituent Assembly election from Communist Party of Nepal (Unified Marxist-Leninist).

References

Year of birth missing (living people)
Communist Party of Nepal (Unified Marxist–Leninist) politicians
Living people
Members of the 2nd Nepalese Constituent Assembly